The 1984 DFB-Pokal Final decided the winner of the 1983–84 DFB-Pokal, the 41st season of Germany's premier knockout football cup competition. It was played on 31 May 1984 at the Waldstadion in Frankfurt. Bayern Munich won the match 7–6 on penalties against Borussia Mönchengladbach, following a 1–1 draw after extra time, to claim their seventh cup title.

This was the first time a cup final went to penalties, and the longest final penalty shoot-out to date, with the teams having taken eight each. The match was also Lothar Matthäus's final match for Gladbach before his summer move to Bayern. Controversy raged after Matthäus missed his penalty over the crossbar against his future employer in the shoot-out, with Borussia fans questioning his loyalty after the match.

With the win, Bayern qualified for the 1984–85 European Cup Winners' Cup, where they went on to reach the semi-finals, being knocked out by Everton.

Route to the final
The DFB-Pokal began with 64 teams in a single-elimination knockout cup competition. There were a total of five rounds leading up to the final. Teams were drawn against each other, and the winner after 90 minutes would advance. If still tied, 30 minutes of extra time was played. If the score was still level, a replay would take place at the original away team's stadium. If still level after 90 minutes, 30 minutes of extra time was played. If the score was still level, a drawing of lots would decide who would advance to the next round.

Note: In all results below, the score of the finalist is given first (H: home; A: away).

Match

Details

References

External links
 Match report at kicker.de 
 Match report at WorldFootball.net
 Match report at Fussballdaten.de 

FC Bayern Munich matches
Borussia Mönchengladbach matches
1983–84 in German football cups
1984
Football in Frankfurt
Sports competitions in Frankfurt
May 1984 sports events in Europe
Association football penalty shoot-outs
1980s in Frankfurt